Dean Morgan (born 1970) is an English international lawn and indoor bowler.

He was selected as part of the 2002 Commonwealth Games team and won a silver medal in the pairs with Stephen Farish at the Games in Manchester.

He started bowling aged 14 and joined the successful Boscombe Cliff Bowling Club in 1985 before earning his international indoor debut in 1993 and outdoor debut in 1998.

References

Living people
1970 births
Bowls players at the 2002 Commonwealth Games
English male bowls players
Commonwealth Games medallists in lawn bowls
Commonwealth Games silver medallists for England
Medallists at the 2002 Commonwealth Games